Pet Lovers Centre Pte Ltd (PLC) is an Asian retailer of pet products and services. It is one of the largest and oldest pet store chains in Singapore. Today, PLC has  67 stores in Singapore, 55 stores in Malaysia, 16 stores in Thailand, 2 stores in Vietnam, and 20 stores in Philippines.

In 1980, the firm launched its own brand of pet accessories called Trustie, and in 1996, launched its food brand called Burp! PLC became a franchise-able brand in 2008. PLC publishes a pet magazine in Singapore, called Petlovers Magazine. In 2012, PLC organised a meet-and-greet event for pet lovers to meet celebrity Cesar Millan. In December 2012, the company launched a mobile app and mobile site. The app and mobile site included a chat function and GPS locations of each store.

Pet Lovers Centre Pte Ltd (PLC) was established in 1973 by two brothers, Robert Ng Fook Leon and David Ng Fook Choy. Their first retail store was set up at Shaw House and Centre on Scotts Road. In 1995, Robert Ng Fook Leon's youngest son, Ng Whye Hoe, took over the business together with his school friend when the company ran into financial difficulties.

Philanthropy
Through the Pet Lovers Foundation, a non-profit organization established by PLC, animal welfare organizations such as Save Our Street Dogs receive support from the sale of Petlovers Magazine.

References

External links
Company Website
A gift for pet lover Pet Face Socks 
 

Pet stores
1973 establishments in Singapore
Retail companies established in 1973